Djamel Beghal (also transliterated as Jamel Beghal and Djamel Begal) (born December 2nd 1965 in Bordj Bou Arréridj, Algeria) is an Algerian terrorist convict. He married Sylvie, a French citizen, in 1990, while working as a youth worker in Corbeil-Essonnes. In 1997, he moved his family to Leicester, where Sylvie still lives with their four children.

On 28 July 2001, he was arrested at Dubai International Airport while transferring from a flight from Pakistan to a flight to Europe; he held a fake French passport. Over the next two months, he was interrogated by the Emirati police. CAGE, a London-based Islamic activist organization, claimed that Emirati police tortured Beghal during questioning and accused   the British and French governments of 'complicity'. No evidence was offered to substantiate those claims other than the testimony of Beghal himself. Beghal confessed to UAE authorities that he was conspiring to destroy the U.S. embassy in Paris. His confession doomed the plot. After he was extradited to France on 1 October, Beghal retracted his statement, saying that it had been given under torture.

In October 2001, Beghal told magistrate Jean-Louis Bruguière that he had visited Osama bin Laden's base in Afghanistan and planned a suicide bomb attack.

In March 2005, French authorities convicted Beghal and five others for planning the attacks, and Beghal began serving his 10-year sentence. During his time in prison, he met and mentored fellow prisoners Chérif Kouachi, one of the two brothers who committed the 2015 Charlie Hebdo shooting, as well as Amedy Coulibaly, who carried out the Fontenay-aux-Roses shooting and Porte de Vincennes siege. Stripped  in 2006 of the French citizenship which he had acquired through his marriage, Beghal was released from prison and expelled to Algeria on 16 July 2018.

References

1965 births
Living people
People from Bordj Bou Arréridj
Algerian emigrants to France
Algerian al-Qaeda members
French al-Qaeda members
People extradited to France
People extradited from the United Arab Emirates